Vice presidential elections were held in Paraguay on 13 August 2000, following the assassination of Luis María Argaña. The result was a victory for Julio César Franco of the Authentic Radical Liberal Party, who received 49.6% of the vote. Voter turnout was 60.7%.

Results

References

Paraguay
2000 in Paraguay
Elections in Paraguay
Vice presidential elections
August 2000 events in South America